Monstrous Regiment is a fantasy novel by British writer Terry Pratchett, the 31st novel in  his Discworld series. It takes its name from a 16th-century tract by John Knox opposing female rule, titled The First Blast of the Trumpet Against the Monstrous Regiment of Women.

The cover illustration of the British edition, by Paul Kidby, is a parody of Joe Rosenthal's photograph Raising the Flag on Iwo Jima. Monstrous Regiment was nominated for a Locus Award in 2004.

Plot summary
The bulk of Monstrous Regiment takes place in the small, bellicose country of Borogravia, a highly conservative nation, whose people live according to the increasingly strange (and harmful) decrees of its favored deity, Nuggan. The main feature of his religion is the Abominations; a long, often-updated list of banned things. To put this in perspective, these things include garlic, cats, the smell of beets, people with ginger hair, shirts with six buttons, anyone shorter than three feet (namely dwarves, children and babies), sneezing, jigsaw puzzles, chocolate (which was once Borogravia's staple export, plunging the country into increasing poverty), crop rotation (which denigrated Borogravia's food supplies), and the colour blue.

The list of "Abominations Unto Nuggan" often causes conflicts with Borogravia's neighbours, with uncertainty over the whereabouts of Nuggan and how to lead moral lives leading the inhabitants of Borogravia to deify their Duchess, to whom they pray instead as the traditional head of the Nugganitic church. This slowly causes problems as, on the Discworld, belief grants power. Borogravia is in the midst of a war against an alliance of neighbouring countries, caused by a border dispute with the country of Zlobenia. Other factors include Zlobenia's Prince Heinrich claim to the Borogravian throne, believing his aunt, the long-unseen Duchess, to be dead, and Ankh-Morpork's diplomatic involvement following the destruction of Clacks towers by Borogravia. Rumour is that the war is going poorly for Borogravia, though the country's leadership (and "everyone") denies it.

Polly Perks's brother Paul is missing in action after fighting in the Borogravian army. Paul is naive and believes what he is told regardless of the credibility or political leanings of the source, and even though Polly is more qualified to take over the family business (a famous pub known as "The Duchess"), according to Nugganitic law, women cannot own property, so if Paul does not return the pub will be lost to their drunken cousin when their father dies. Partly to ensure her own future but mainly to ascertain whether Paul is alive, Polly sets off to join the army in order to find him. Women joining the army are regarded as an Abomination Unto Nuggan, so Polly decides to dress up as a man (another Abomination) and enlists as Private Oliver Perks (taking her name from the folk song "Sweet Polly Oliver"), a song that her father sang to her when she was a young girl.

While signing up, Polly encounters the repulsively patriotic Corporal Strappi, and the corpulent Sergeant Jackrum. Despite her apprehensions regarding Strappi, she kisses the Duchess – that is, she kisses a painting of said noble – and by doing so, joins up. Due to the shortage of troops, her fellow soldiers include a vampire named Maladict, a troll named Carborundum, and an Igor named Igor. They also include "Tonker" Halter, "Shufti" Manickle, "Wazzer" Goom, and "Lofty" Tewt.

That night, Polly encounters an unknown supporter whilst answering a call of nature, who assures her that although they know that Polly is a girl, they won't give her away. They also give her some hints on how not to be discovered. Over the next few days, Polly makes a startling discovery: Lofty is also a girl. Since Lofty and Tonker are always together, Polly assumes that Lofty joined the army to follow her man, just like in "Sweet Polly Oliver". Later, she finds out that Shufti is another girl, and a pregnant one. She also joined the army to find her man; in this case, the father of her child, who she'd only known for a few days, and is known as Johnny.

Gradually, Polly discovers not only that everyone in her regiment is female, but also receives confirmation of Borogravia's bleak situation. Most of her country's forces are captured or on the run, and food supplies are limited. This point is driven home when Igor (actually Igorina) demonstrates her surgery talents and saves several lives among a group of badly injured fleeing soldiers.

The regiment, under the leadership of their inexperienced commanding officer Lieutenant Blouse, makes its way toward the Keep where the enemy is based. Meanwhile, thanks to a chance encounter where the regiment unknowingly subdue and humiliate an elite Zlobenian detachment, including Prince Heinrich, their exploits become known to the outside world through William de Worde and his newspaper, The Ankh-Morpork Times. Their progress particularly piques the interest of Commander Vimes, who is stationed with the alliance at the Keep. Vimes has his officers keep track of the regiment, occasionally secretly providing aid. As a result of Maladict suffering from caffeine withdrawal following the loss of his coffee-making equipment, he and other members of the regiment experience 'flashsides' to Earth's Vietnam War.

Polly and most of the regiment are able to infiltrate the Keep, disguising themselves as washerwomen, and once inside plot to release the captured Borogravian troops. They manage to do so, and Borogravia is able to retake much of the Keep, but when Polly admits they are women, their own forces remove them from the conflict and they are brought in front of a council of senior officers, where their fate will be decided. With the council about to discharge them and force them to return home, Jackrum barges in and intervenes, revealing that a third of the military's top officers (including Chief of the General Staff General Froc) are actually women as well. But in the midst of this revelation, the Duchess, now raised to the level of a small deity by Borogravians' belief, takes brief possession of Wazzer, her most passionate believer. The Duchess urges all of the generals to quit the war and return home, to repair their country, returning their kiss of service, and ending their obligation to her. It is revealed that Nuggan is now dead, being reduced to a whisper, with the new Abominations (the last being rocks, ears and accordion players) being produced by the collective anxiety of his 'worshippers'.

In a private moment with Jackrum, Polly reveals to her Sergeant that she now knows him to (physically) be a woman and persuades Jackrum to go to the home of his grown son William and reveal himself as William's long-lost father. The regiment is sent to the enemy and successfully negotiates a truce, and military rules are changed so that women are allowed to serve openly and Maladict reveals himself as really being Maladicta. Polly finds her brother alive and well and they return home to the Duchess with Shufti, who joins Polly in her refusal to be subjugated on the basis of her gender and marital status. The other members of the regiment go on to lives that they would not have been able to consider before their emancipation, such as Igorina opening a gynaecology clinic on the basis that many women would prefer to see a female practitioner.

Sometime later, despite the peace they had desperately fought for, conflict breaks out again. Polly, having received correspondence from Sgt Jackrum, leaves the tavern to seek new ways to fight a war using the influence she gained and finds herself in the role of commander of boy-impersonating young women who are marching off to war, reuniting with Maladicta.

Characters

Borogravians
Grand Duchess Annagovia
General Froc
Major Clogston
Lieutenant Blouse (of the Tenth Infantry)
Private Lart Hubukurk the younger
Private Joe Hubukurk the elder (retired)
Sergeant-Major Jack Jackrum
Corporal Strappi
Polly Perks
Igor
Maladict
Carborundum
"Tonker" Halter
"Shufti" Manickle
"Wazzer" Goom
"Lofty" Tewt
Enid

Zlobenians and other neighboring countries
Prince Heinrich

Ankh-Morporkians
Samuel Vimes (of the Ankh-Morpork City Watch)
Angua von Überwald
Buggy Swires
Reg Shoe
Clarence Chinny (Consul to Zlobenia)
William de Worde (of the Ankh-Morpork Times)
Otto Chriek (of the Ankh-Morpork Times)
Ronald Rust

Reception

The New York Times felt that Monstrous Regiment "had serious heft", comparing Pratchett's depiction of "the pity of war" to Wilfred Owen. The Chicago Reader, addressing the 2014 stage adaptation, considered it to be largely "a satire on the flimsiness of traditional gender roles", while Publishers Weekly noted its "astute comments on power, religious intolerance and sexual stereotyping".

At Boing Boing, Cory Doctorow lauded Pratchett's "capacity for marvellous bathos", "epic" characterization, and "drum-tight" plotting, commending the "sprightliness" with which the novel's philosophical themes are integrated into the text. PopMatters felt that the book lacked subtlety, but was "more than one-dimensional", commending Pratchett for "manag[ing] to walk right on the edge of proselytizing without ever quite crossing over" and for showing that there is no "clear-cut solution" to the issues which led to the Borogravian conflict. BuzzFeed, however, was far more negative, calling it "clunky", and ranking it last among the adult-oriented Discworld novels published prior to the announcement of Pratchett's diagnosis with Alzheimer's disease.

References

External links

 
Annotations for Monstrous Regiment
Quotes from Monstrous Regiment
Monstrous Regiment at Worlds Without End
Milunka Savić Milunka Savič story

2003 fantasy novels
2003 British novels
Cross-dressing in literature
Discworld books
Doubleday (publisher) books
Novels set in fictional wars
British comedy novels